Mutton curry (also referred to as kosha mangsho,  lamb curry, or goat curry) is a dish that is prepared from goat meat (or sometimes lamb meat) and vegetables. The dish is found in different variations across all states, countries and regions of South Asia and the Caribbean.

Mutton curry was originally prepared putting all the ingredients together in a earthen pot and slow cooking the whole curry by wood fire on a clay oven. Today it is cooked using pressure cookers and slow cookers after briefly sautéing all the ingredients and spices in a big wok. The steadily cooked mutton becomes more tender than normally cooked mutton. Mutton curry is generally served with rice or with Indian breads, such as naan or parotta. The dish can also be served with ragi, a cereal.

Ingredients 

Common ingredients used to prepare mutton curry include: mutton or goat meat, salt, turmeric powder, mustard oil, ginger garlic paste, dahi (yogurt), assortment of spices, onion, chilli, tomato, and coriander leaves.

Variations

Odisha 
In Odisha mutton curry is always made of khasi goat meat (meat of young castrated male goat). There are many varieties of goat meat curries prepared in Odisha. Simple and flavorful ingredients are used to prepare the curry and usually served with roti, naan or in Western Odisha, puffed rice (mudhi). Some of the popular curries are:
 Mutton Kashā
 Mutton Curry
 Mutton Roasted in Bamboo or Bamboo Mutton
 Mutton Roasted in Leaf
 Mutton in Clay Pot
 Mutton Besar

While mutton curry is usually eaten with rice, in Western Odisha Mangsa Kashā is particularly relished with mudhi (puffed rice). Mangsa Kashā is said to be the predecessor of the popular Bengali goat curry dish known as Kosha Mangsho most probably introduced by the Odia cooks who moved to West Bengal during the British rule to work in the kitchens of Bengali families.

West Bengal 
Kosha mangsho is the Bengali version of mutton curry. It traditionally has less juice and more gravy than mutton curries eaten in other parts of India. This dish is prepared in a kosha style, which involves retaining the mutton's flavor and moisture using slow cooking and sautéeing methods.

Kosha mangsho is traditionally prepared as part of the celebration of Kali Puja, a festival dedicated to the Hindu goddess Kali, celebrated on the New Moon day of the Hindu month Kartik.

Railway mutton curry is a British Raj colonial-era dish that was served on long-distance trains. The dish was served with dinner rolls. Tamarind was originally used to extend its shelf life. Some restaurants serve the dish in present-day times, such as Oh! Calcutta! restaurant in Kolkata, India. Railway mutton curry is prepared using a coconut milk base.

Maharashtra 
Black Mutton curry (also referred to as konkani black mutton) is a dish that is prepared from goat or lamb meat, charred coconuts, and a signature spice blend. The regional dish originated in the Konkani district of Maharashtra, India.

Black Mutton curry was originally made by preparing a black spice paste consisting of charred coconuts, onions and peppers with spices which was then cooked low and slow in a cast iron wok. The cooked paste was added with the mutton along with fresh herbs and spices in an earthen pot and cooked low and slow till tender. The curry is typically served with breads such as naan, paratha or rice.

The dish utilizes a unique blend of spices called the Maharashtrian garam masala, which consists of cardamom, nutmeg, khus khus (poppy seeds), saunth (dried ginger), and many other Mughlai spices which lend the black mouton an intoxicating flavor and a robust color.

Counterfeit variations
In 2012, in The Midlands, England, trading standards officers working undercover went to twenty restaurants that were randomly chosen and bought 39 lamb curry and kebab dishes. Four of the dishes contained no lamb, instead using a mixture that contained beef, pork or chicken. In the investigation, it was found that only three lamb curries out of the nineteen tested contained only lamb. Most were found to consist of a mixture of lamb with beef or chicken. Additionally, all of the twenty lamb kebabs that were sampled contained meats in addition to lamb that was mixed with it, such as beef, pork or chicken.

See also
 List of Indian dishes
 Cuisine of Odisha

References

External links 

 

Indian cuisine
Bengali cuisine
Pakistani cuisine
Indo-Caribbean curries
Curry
Lamb dishes
Odia cuisine
Bangladeshi meat dishes